Parliamentary Counsel Office may refer to:

 The Office of Parliamentary Counsel (Australia)
 The Office of the Parliamentary Counsel (United Kingdom), the British Government office responsible for drafting government Bills
 The Office of the Parliamentary Counsel to Government, the equivalent office of the Government of Ireland
 The Parliamentary Counsel Office (New Zealand), the equivalent state sector organisation of the Government of New Zealand
 The Parliamentary Counsel Office (Scotland), the equivalent directorate of the Scottish Government

In other jurisdictions, the term legislative counsel or similar may refer to:

 The Cabinet Legislation Bureau for the Cabinet of Japan
 The Office for the Welsh Legislative Counsel for the devolved National Assembly for Wales
 The Office of the Legislative Counsel of the United States House of Representatives
 The California Legislative Counsel for the California state legislature
 The Oregon Legislative Counsel for the Oregon Legislative Assembly

See also 
 Parliamentary counsel